The  is a famous thurible in the Santiago de Compostela Cathedral. In the past, similar devices were used in large churches in Galicia; one is still used in Tui Cathedral. Incense is burned in this swinging metal container, or censer.

Description

The Botafumeiro is suspended from a pulley mechanism in the dome on the roof of the church. The current pulley mechanism was installed in 1604.

The present Botafumeiro is made of an alloy of brass and bronze and is plated by a very thin 20-micrometre layer of silver. The current Botafumeiro was created by the gold and silversmith José Losada in 1851. It has a golden sheen.

The Santiago de Compostela Botafumeiro is one of the largest censers in the world, weighing 80 kg and measuring 1.60 m in height. It is normally on display in the library of the cathedral, but for certain important religious occasions, it is brought to the floor of the cathedral and attached to a rope hung from the pulley mechanism.

It was created in 1971 by the sacred art artisans working under the craftsman Luis Molina Acedo.

The ropes typically last about 20 years before they have to be replaced. However, recently a thicker rope than usual was used, and the extra rubbing produced premature wear of the rope. Therefore, this thicker rope had to be replaced sooner than had been expected, in 2004. Before 2004, the ropes were woven from hemp, or a type of grass called esparto, and made in Vigo, Spain. Since 2004, a rope made of synthetic material has been used.

The censer is pushed initially to start its motion. Eight red-robed  pull the ropes, producing increasingly large oscillations of the censer. The thurible's swings almost reach the ceiling of the transept. The incensory can reach speeds of 68 km/h as it dispenses thick clouds of incense.

At the top of the swing, the Botafumeiro reaches heights of 21 meters. It swings in a 65-meter arc between the Azabachería and Praterias doorways at the ends of the transept. The maximum angle achieved is about 82°. The maximum can be reached after about 17 cycles, and requires about 80 seconds of swinging.

It costs about €450 for each thurible "performance" at the cathedral. Although this is expensive, the swinging of the thurible is very popular with pilgrims, tourists and visitors.

The Botafumeiro produces large volumes of smoke.

Numerous sources report different weights of the Botafumeiro ranging from 50 kilograms to 160 kilograms.

Tiraboleiros
The Botafumeiro is carried and swung by eight men in red robes, called . The term  is a Galician derivation from the Latin word , which means 'incense carrier', and from which is derived the English equivalent, thurifer. This comes from the Latin words , meaning 'incense', and ', meaning 'carry'. There is a comparable term in Spanish, .

History
One tradition has it that the use of a swinging censer in the Santiago de Compostela Cathedral began in the 11th century. Arriving pilgrims were tired and unwashed. It was also believed that incense smoke had a prophylactic effect at the time of plagues and epidemics. Incense burning is also an important part of the liturgy, being an "oration to God", or form of prayer.

In the 13th century, the pulley mechanism was changed to incorporate a set of coaxial drums of different diameters.

In the 15th century, France's King Louis XI (1423–1483) donated money to the cathedral to replace their medieval thurible, which was made of silver. A new silver thurible was put into service in 1554. Unfortunately, this ornate vessel was stolen by Napoleon's troops in April, 1809, during an episode in the Spanish War of Independence (1808–1814). Therefore, the Louis XI censer was replaced by the present less-ostentatious Losada thurible in 1851.

After 155 years of use, the Botafumeiro was restored in early 2006 by artisans and craftsmen working under Luis Molina Acedo. They repaired the dents and cracks in the Botafumeiro and reapplied a 20 micrometre thick plating of silver to the vessel.

Many other cathedrals had similar large thuribles at one time. However, most of the other cathedrals discontinued the use of their swinging censers over the years.

Accidents
Over the years, a number of accidents have occurred during the swinging of the Botafumeiro. Apparently at one time, the Botafumeiro was attached to the rope with a hook which sometimes became disconnected.

One of the most renowned accidents took place during a visit of Princess Catherine of Aragon. She was on a journey to marry the heir to the English throne in 1499 and stopped by the cathedral in Santiago de Compostela. While it was being swung, the Botafumeiro flew out of the cathedral through the Platerias high window. No one was reported to have been injured on this occasion.

The ropes and other devices securing the Botafumeiro have also failed; on May 23, 1622, and more recently in 1925 and July 1937. In July 1937, the cords holding the Botafumeiro failed again, and hot coals were spilled onto the floor.

Current procedure is to attach the rope to the Botafumeiro with a set of sailor's knots.

Footnotes and references

External links

 The official site of the Santiago de Compostela cathedral
 Botafumeiro pictures

Botafumeiro simulations
 A simulation of the motion of the Botafumeiro
 Another simulation of the motion of the Botafumeiro

Videos
 Botafumeiro video 
 HD movie of the Botafumeiro

Buildings and structures in Santiago de Compostela
Christian religious objects
Incense equipment
Religion in Galicia (Spain)
Roman Catholic cathedrals in Galicia (Spain)
Tourist attractions in Galicia (Spain)